Longueau station (French: Gare de Longueau) is a railway station in Longueau near Amiens, France. It is situated on the Paris–Lille railway. Longueau is served by trains of the TER Hauts-de-France and Intercités networks. As well as serving as a passenger station, Longueau is also home to one of the North of France's largest engine sheds, which include a roundhouse and turntable.

Longueau is linked to the region's large cities; Lille, Amiens, Compiègne, Calais and Paris.

References

Railway stations in Somme (department)
Railway stations in France opened in 1846